Carpomya is a genus of tephritid  or fruit flies in the family Tephritidae.

Species
Carpomya incompleta (Becker, 1903)
Carpomya schineri (Loew, 1856)
Carpomya vesuviana A. Costa, 1854

Species sometimes included in Carpomya:
Goniglossum wiedemanni (Meigen, 1826) (as Carpomya wiedemanni (Meigen, 1826))
Myiopardalis pardalina (Bigot, 1891) (as Carpomya pardalina (Bigot, 1891))

References

Biolib
Keys for Carpomya

Tephritidae genera
Trypetinae